S Sushma   versus Commissioner of Police   (2021) is a landmark decision of the Madras High Court that prohibited Conversion Therapy in India. The Court suggested comprehensive measures to sensitize the society and various branches of the state and federal government including the Police and judiciary to remove prejudices against the LGBTQIA+ (queer) community. The Court suggested that changes be made to the curricula of schools and universities to educate students on understanding the queer community.

Background 
The Petitioners, a lesbian couple whose relationship was being opposed by their parents fled to Chennai from their respective houses in Madurai. The couple with the support extended by certain NGOs and persons belonging to the queer community managed to secure accommodation and protection and were in search of employment to financially sustain themselves. Meanwhile, the parents individually filed girl-missing-complaints before the Inspector of Police and two FIRs came to be registered. Having faced interrogation by the police at their residential premises, and apprehending threat to their safety and security, the couple approached this Court seeking a direction to the police not to cause harassment and protection from any form of threat or danger to their safety and security from their parents.

Trial 
The Court ordered the petitioners and their parents to undergo counseling with Ms. Vidya Dinakaran, the psychologist.

After the first round of counselling, the psychologist submitted a report on 28 April 2021, stating that the petitioners perfectly understand the relationship between them and had absolutely no confusion in their minds. The report stated that the petitioners want to continue their education and work and also stay in touch with their parents. However, they feared that their parents might force them to get separated now and were willing to wait until the latter could understand the relationship. While reporting on the parents of the petitioners, the psychologist reported that they were more concerned about the stigma attached to the relationship in the society and the consequences that may ensue on their family. The report also stated that the parents were also very much concerned about the safety and security of their respective daughters. The report said that the parents would rather prefer their daughters to live a life of celibacy, which according to them will be more dignified than having a partner of the same sex. They also had serious confusions regarding the lineage, adoption and other normal consequences that follow a heterosexual relationship and as to how the same would apply in a case of same sex relationship.

The counsel for the petitioners requested the Court to set out guidelines in cases of this nature. In response to the request, in an unprecedented move, Justice N Anand Venkatesh has decided to undergo psycho-education before penning a judgment on same sex relationships. The Judge requested Ms. Vidya Dinakaran, the psychologist to give him an appointment so that the professional could help him understand such relationships and pave the way for “his evolution”.

Judgment 
Justice N Anand Venkatesh prohibited Conversion Therapy. He suggested comprehensive measures to sensitize the society and various branches of the state and federal governments including the Police and judiciary to remove prejudices against the queer community. He suggested that changes be made to the curricula of schools and universities to educate students on understanding the queer community.

Judge said that psyhco-educative counseling on queer issues helped him shed his personal ignorance and prejudices. He clearly stated in the judgment that the responsibility to change, the burden of unlearning stigma, and learning about the lived experience of the queer community lies on the society and not the queer individuals.

The court recognized that there’s an absence of a specific law to protect the interests of queer people and acknowledged it is the responsibility of the constitutional courts to fill this vacuum with necessary directions to ensure the protection of such couples from harassment sourced from stigma and prejudices.

Interim directions 
On June 7, 2021, the Court issued the interim directions for State Government of Tamil Nadu, Government of India and various governmental and professional agencies.

The police, on receipt of any complaint regarding a missing person cases which upon investigation is found to involve consenting adults belonging to the queer community, shall upon receipt of their statements, close the complaint without subjecting them to any harassment.

The Ministry of Social Justice & Empowerment (MSJE), should enlist Non-Governmental Organizations (NGOs) including community-based groups which have sufficient expertise in handling the issues faced by the queer community. The list of such NGOs along with the address, contact details, and services provided should be published and revised periodically on the official website. The Court ordered the Ministry to publish the list within eight weeks from the date of receipt of copy of the order. The Court directed the concerned NGO to maintain confidential records of such persons who approach the enlisted NGOs. The aggregate data to be provided to the concerned Ministry bi-annually.

The Court directed any person who faces an issue for the reason of their belongingness to the queer community to approach any of the enlisted NGOs for safeguarding and protecting their rights. Such problems should be addressed with the best-suited method depending on the facts and circumstances of each case be it counseling, monetary support, legal assistance with the support of District Legal Services Authority, or to co-ordinate with law enforcement agencies about offenses committed against any persons belonging to the queer community.

Regarding the issue of accommodation, suitable changes are to be made in existing short stay homes, Anganwadi shelters, and “garima greh” (a shelter home for transgender persons, the purpose of which is to provide shelter to transgender persons, with basic amenities like shelter, food, medical care and recreational facilities. Besides, it will provide support for capacity building/skill development of persons in the community, which will enable them to lead a life of dignity and respect) to accommodate any and every member of the queer community, who require shelters and/or homes. The Court directed the MSJE to make adequate infrastructural arrangements in this regard, within a period of 12 weeks from the date of receipt of copy of the order.

The Court directed the Union and State Governments respectively, in consultation with such other Ministries and/or Departments to device measures and policies that are needed for eliminating prejudices against the queer community, and integrating them into the mainstream society.

Further directions were issued by the Court on September 1, 2021.

Physical and Mental Health Professionals 
On June 7, 2021, the Court stated that any attempts to medically “cure” or change the sexual orientation of queer people to heterosexual or the gender identity of transgender people to cisgender should be prohibited. The action should be initiated against the concerned professional involving themselves in any form or method of conversion “therapy”, including withdrawal of license to practice.
The Court directed the State and the Union Government to conduct mental health camps and awareness programs to improve the understanding of gender, sexuality, sexual orientation and promote acceptance of diversity.

Police and Prison authorities 
On June 7, 2021, the court directed Police and Prison authorities to hold programs at regular intervals on steps to be taken for protection from and prevention of offenses against the queer community. It directed the concerned authorities to conduct sensitization programs about legal rights of queer community at regular intervals. It directed the concerned authorities to conduct sensitization programs for police personnel creating awareness about the Offenses and Penalties as stipulated under Chapter VIII of The Transgender Persons (Protection of Rights) Act, 2019 and compliance of Rule 11 of the Transgender Persons (Protection of Rights) Rules, 2020. The Court recommended the NGOs with community support conduct the outreach programs. The outreach programs should prioritize first-hand problems faced at the hands of law enforcement agencies and train them in providing effective assistance.

The Court directed the prison authorities to ensure that transgender and gender-nonconforming prisoners are housed separately from cis-men prisoners to eliminate chances of sexual assault.

On September 1, 2021, the Court directed the State Government of India to add a specific clause in the Police Conduct Rules. The clause would treat any harassment by the police to the persons belonging to belonging to the LGBTQIA+ community and/or to the activists and NGO workers as misconduct and should punish officials involved in such misconduct.

Judiciary 
On June 7, 2021, the Court directed the concerned authorities to conduct awareness programs for Judicial Officers at all levels in coordination with the enlisted NGOs and community support and to provide recommendations to ensure non-discrimination of persons belonging to the queer community.

Educational institutions 
On June 7, 2021, the Court directed educational institutes to use the Parent Teachers Association (PTA) meetings to sensitize parents on issues of queer community and gender non-conforming students to ensure supportive families. The Court directed the educational institutes to make necessary amendment to policies and resources to include students belonging to queer community in all spheres of school and college life. In this regard, the following suggestions were issued:

 Ensure availability of gender-neutral restrooms for the gender-nonconforming student.
 Change of name and gender on academic records for transgender persons.
 Inclusion of ‘transgender’ in addition to M and F gender columns in application forms for admission, competitive entrance exams, etc.
 Appointment of counselors who are LGBTQIA+ inclusive, for the staffs and students to address grievances, if any, and to provide effective solutions for the same.

Impact

Conversion Therapy as Professional Misconduct 
Following the Judgement, on 2 September 2022, National Medical Commission declared provision of conversion therapy as an act of professional misconduct. It wrote to all the State Medical Councils empowering them to take disciplinary action against medical professionals if they provide “conversion therapy”.

Significance 
The ruling directed the Indian Medical and Psychiatry professional bodies to prohibit ‘conversion therapy’ following this unprecedented and progressive judgment.

See also 
 LGBT rights in India
 Devu G v. State Of Kerala (2023)
 Poonam Rani v. State of Uttar Pradesh (2021)
 Navtej Singh Johar v. Union of India (2018)

Similar landmark decisions 
 Ferguson v. JONAH
 Pickup v. Brown and Welch v. Brown

References

External links 
 

LGBT rights in India
Indian LGBT rights case law
2021 in case law
2021 in India
2021 in LGBT history
Conversion therapy
High Courts of India cases
Madras High Court